Brière is the marsh area to the north of the Loire estuary in France at its mouth on the Atlantic Ocean.

Brière may also refer to:

Places 
 Brière Regional Natural Park, a protected area in the Pays de la Loire region of France
 Saint-Maclou-la-Brière, a commune in the Seine-Maritime, Normandy, France
 Saint-Mars-la-Brière, a commune in the Sarthe department, Pays de la Loire, France

People
 Alexandre Jacques François Brière de Boismont (1797–1881), French physician
 Daniel Brière (born 1977), Canadian former professional ice hockey player and executive
 Denis Brière, Canadian forestry professor and academic administrator
 Élisabeth Brière (born 1968), Canadian Liberal politician 
 Gaston Brière (1871–1962), French art historian and head curator
 Henri Brière (1873–1957), French politician
 Léo Brière, French mentalist and illusionist
 Louis Brière de l'Isle (1827–1896), French Army general
 Michel Brière (1949–1971), Canadian professional ice hockey player 
 Michael Briere, Canadian software developer who was condemned for the abduction and murder of Holly Maria Jones
 Murat Brierre (1938–1988), Haitian metal sculptor
 Yves de La Brière (1877–1941), French Jesuit theologian and author

Other uses 
 La Brière, a 1923 novel by Alphonse de Chateaubriant 
 Michel Brière Memorial Trophy, a player award in the Quebec Major Junior Hockey League

See also
 Brier (disambiguation)
 Briers (disambiguation)